Ultra is the second studio album by Estonian singer Laura Põldvere. The album was physically released on December 8, 2009 in Estonia by Moonwalk studios. The first single off the album, "Destiny", took part in the Estonian contest Eesti Laul 2010 where it reached third place.

Track listing

Laura Põldvere albums
2009 albums
Estonian-language albums